Man on the Moon (Music from the Motion Picture) is the soundtrack to the 1999 film Man on the Moon. The soundtrack was released on November 22, 1999, in the UK and November 23, 1999, in the US. It was issued on Warner Bros. Records, in conjunction with Jersey Records, a part of Danny DeVito's Jersey Group.

Track listing
 "Mighty Mouse Theme (Here I Come to Save the Day)", (Philip, Scheib, Marshall Barer) performed by The Sandpipers – 1:53
 "The Great Beyond" (Peter Buck, Mike Mills, Michael Stipe), performed by R.E.M. – 5:05
 "Kiss You All Over" (Mike Chapman, Nicky Chinn), performed by Exile – 3:37
 "Angela" (Theme to Taxi) (Bob James), performed by Bob James – 1:27
 "Tony Thrown Out" (Buck, Mills, Stipe), performed by orchestra – 1:08
 "Man on the Moon" (Bill Berry, Buck, Mills, Stipe), performed by R.E.M. – 5:13
 "This Friendly World" (Ken Darby), performed by Michael Stipe and Jim Carrey (with the latter portraying both Tony Clifton and Andy Kaufman) – 3:02
 "Miracle" (Buck, Mills, Stipe), performed by Mike Mills and an orchestra – 2:53
 "Lynne & Andy" (Buck, Mills, Stipe), performed by an orchestra – 1:46
 "Rose Marie" (Herbert Stothart, Oscar Hammerstein II, Otto Harbach, Rudolf Friml), performed by Andy Kaufman – 2:36
 "Andy Gets Fired" (Buck, Mills, Stipe), performed by an orchestra – 1:07
 "I Will Survive" (Freddie Perren, Dino Fekaris), performed by Tony Clifton – 1:49
 "Milk & Cookies" (Buck, Mills, Stipe), performed by an orchestra – 1:59
 "Man on the Moon" (Berry, Buck, Mills, Stipe), performed by an orchestra – 1:50
 "One More Song for You" (Michael Omartian, Stormie Omartian), performed by Andy Kaufman – 1:16

Personnel
Chris Bilheimer – packaging design
Anita Camarata – music supervisor
Kaylin Frank – associate music supervisor
Ted Jensen – mastering
Pat McCarthy – production

References

Albums produced by Mike Mills
Albums produced by Michael Stipe
Albums produced by Peter Buck
R.E.M. soundtracks
1999 soundtrack albums
Warner Records soundtracks
Albums produced by Pat McCarthy (record producer)
Drama film soundtracks
Comedy film soundtracks